Elections to Barrow-in-Furness Borough Council were held on 7 May 1998.  One third of the council was up for election and the Labour party stayed in overall control of the council.

After the election, the composition of the council was
Labour 23
Conservative 11
Others 4

Results

References
"Council poll results", The Guardian 9 May 1998 page 16

1998 English local elections
1998
1990s in Cumbria